Blea Water is a tarn or corrie lake which occupies a glacially excavated hollow immediately to the east of High Street in the Lake District, England.

References

Lakes of the Lake District
Eden District